Budapest Tales is a 1976 Hungarian drama film directed by István Szabó. It was entered into the 1977 Cannes Film Festival.

Cast
 Ági Mészáros as Fényes' Mother
 Maja Komorowska as Girl Who Knows the Colors
 Franciszek Pieczka
 András Bálint as Fényes
 Károly Kovács
 Ildikó Bánsági as Widow
 József Madaras as Soldier
 Szymon Szurmiej
 Zoltán Huszárik
 Rita Békés
 Irén Bódis
 Vilmos Kun as The Barber
 Sándor Halmágyi
 Janos Jani

References

External links

1976 films
1970s Hungarian-language films
1976 drama films
Films directed by István Szabó
Hungarian drama films